Fort Worth Independent School District is a school district based in Fort Worth, Texas, United States. Based on a 2017-18 enrollment of 86,234 students, it is the fifth largest school district in Texas.

Fort Worth ISD serves most of the city of Fort Worth, and the cities of Benbrook, Westover Hills, and Westworth Village. The district also covers portions of Arlington, Edgecliff Village, Forest Hill, Haltom City, Kennedale, Sansom Park, White Settlement, and unincorporated portions of Tarrant County.

In 2010, the district unveiled one of the largest, most comprehensive redesigns of secondary education in the nation with its Gold Seal Programs of Choice and Gold Seal Schools of Choice. Each of its 13 high schools introduced curricula focused on college and career pathways. As part of the Gold Seal plan, the district has also opened a single-gender school for girls, the Young Women's Leadership Academy; a single-gender school for boys, the Young Men's Leadership Academy (Paul Laurence Dunbar Young Men's Leadership Academy); an early college high school, Marine Creek Collegiate High School; and an early college medical high school, the Texas Academy of Biomedical Sciences.

In 2018, the school district was given an overall grade of "C" by the Texas Education Agency

History

Superintendent Walter Dansby, who started his FWISD career circa 1974, began his term in 2012. His base salary was $338,817.60. He resigned on Monday June 2, 2014,; the following day the district announced his severance pay, to be doled out over a seven month period, would be over $900,000. His final day of work was January 31, 2015.

In 2019 the district planned a major redraw of attendance boundaries, the first since circa 1999. In 2020 the FWISD board of education accepted proposed changes. Parents upset with some of the changes considered filing lawsuits to stop the changes.

Salary
Teacher salaries in the FWISD are above the state average and significantly higher than the minimum teacher salary schedule in Texas. For the 2018-19 school year, the salary for new teachers with a Bachelor's degree in FWISD averaged $53,000 with no experience. The 2018-19 average salary for teachers with 30 years experience is $70,000. Teachers with a Master's degree or higher and the same years of experience averaged $1,000-$1,500 more per year.

Schools

Secondary schools

High schools (Grades 9-12) 
Zoned

 Amon Carter Riverside High School (1936)
 Arlington Heights High School (1920)
 Benbrook Middle-High School (2011)
 Diamond Hill-Jarvis High School (1903)
 Paul Laurence Dunbar High School (1953)
 Eastern Hills High School (1959)
 North Side High School (1884)
 R. L. Paschal High School (1885)
 Polytechnic High School (1907)
 South Hills High School (1998)
 Southwest High School (1967)
 Trimble Technical High School (1955)
 Western Hills High School (1968)
 O. D. Wyatt High School (1968)

Gold Seal Schools of Choice
 Alice Carlson Applied Learning Center  K-5th (Fort Worth)
 Applied Learning Academy  6th-8th (Fort Worth)
 Como Montessori School  K-8th (Fort Worth)
 Daggett Montessori School  K-8th (Fort Worth)
 I.M. Terrell Academy for STEM & VPA  9th-12th (Fort Worth)
 Marine Creek Collegiate High School  9th-12th (Fort Worth)
 Riverside Applied Learning Center  PK-5th (Fort Worth)
 TCC South/FWISD Collegiate High School  9th-12th (Fort Worth)
 Texas Academy of Biomedical Sciences  9th-12th (Fort Worth)
 World Languages Institute  6th-12th (Fort Worth)
 Young Men's Leadership Academy  6th-12th (Fort Worth)
 Young Women's Leadership Academy  6th-12th (Fort Worth)

Middle Schools (Grades 6-8) 
 Benbrook Middle-High School
 Daggett Middle School 
 J. Martin Jacquet Middle School
 J.P. Elder Middle School
 Leadership Academy @ Forest Oak Middle School
 Glencrest 6th Grade School
 Handley Middle School
 William James Middle School
 Kirkpatrick Middle School
 Leonard Middle School 
 When it first opened, parents were only able to go on a single road, Chapin Road, to get there.
 Jean McClung Middle School
 McLean 6th Grade School
 W.P. McLean Middle School
 W.A. Meacham Middle School
 Meadowbrook Middle School
 William Monnig Middle School
 Morningside Middle School
 Riverside Middle School
 Rosemont Middle School 
 W. C. Stripling Middle School
 Wedgwood 6th Grade School
 Wedgwood Middle School

Other Schools

 Boulevard Heights (Fort Worth)
 Horizons Alternative School (Fort Worth)
 J.J.A.E.P Juvenile Justice Alternative Education Program (Fort Worth)
 Jo Kelly School (Fort Worth)
 Lena Pope Home (Fort Worth)
 Metro Opportunity School (Fort Worth)
 Middle Level Learning Center (Fort Worth)
 International Newcomer Academy (Fort Worth)
 Success High School (Fort Worth)

Primary/Elementary schools 
Harlean Beal Elementary School (Forest Hill)
Benbrook Elementary School (Benbrook)
Bonnie Brae Elementary School
Edward J. Briscoe Elementary School
Burton Hill Elementary School (Westworth Village)
Carroll Peak Elementary School
Carter Park Elementary School
Cesar Chavez Elementary School
George C. Clarke Elementary School
Lily B. Clayton Elementary School
Como Elementary School
Alice D. Contreras Elementary School
E.M. Daggett Elementary School
Clifford Davis Elementary School
De Zavala Elementary School
Diamond Hill Elementary School
S.S. Dillow Elementary School
East Handley Elementary School
Eastern Hills Elementary School
Bill J. Elliott Elementary School
M.G. Ellis Primary School (PreK-K)
Glen Park Elementary School
2004 National Blue Ribbon School
W.M. Green Elementary School
Greenbriar Elementary School
H.V. Helbing Elementary School
Natha Howell Elementary School (Haltom City)
Hubbard Heights Elementary School
Dolores Huerta Elementary School
Manuel Jara Elementary School
M.L. Kirkpatrick Elementary School
Maude I. Logan Elementary School
Lowery Road Elementary School
Atwood McDonald Elementary School
D. McRae Elementary School
Meadowbrook Elementary School
Rufino Mendoza Elementary School
2003 National Blue Ribbon School
Luella Merrett Elementary School
Mitchell Boulevard Elementary School
In 2018 the district categorized the school as a "leadership academy" as a way to turn around historically low test scores.
M.H. Moore Elementary School
Morningside Elementary School
Christene C. Moss Elementary School
Charles Nash Elementary School
North Hi Mount Elementary School
Oakhurst Elementary School
Oaklawn Elementary School
A.M. Pate Elementary School
Mary Louise Phillips Elementary School
Ridglea Hills Elementary School
Sam Rosen Elementary School
Sagamore Hill Elementary School
David K. Sellars Elementary School (Forest Hill)
Seminary Hills Park Elementary School
Bruce Shulkey Elementary School
T.A. Sims Elementary School
South Hi Mount Elementary School
South Hills Elementary School
Springdale Elementary School
J.T. Stevens Elementary School
Sunrise-McMillan Elementary School
Tanglewood Elementary School
1991-92 National Blue Ribbon School
I.M. Terrell Elementary School
W.J. Turner Elementary School
Van Zandt-Guinn Elementary School
Maudrie M. Walton Elementary School
Washington Heights Elementary School
Waverly Park Elementary School
West Handley Elementary School
Westcliff Elementary School
Westcreek Elementary School
Western Hills Elementary School (2-5)
Western Hills Primary School (PreK-1)
Westpark Elementary School (Benbrook)
Versia L. Williams Elementary School
Richard J. Wilson Elementary School
Woodway Elementary School
Worth Heights Elementary School
John T. White Elementary School

See also 

List of school districts in Texas

References

External links

 Fort Worth ISD
 Fort Worth ISD Council of PTAs
 Fort Worth ISD Library Media Services

 
School districts in Tarrant County, Texas